This list of Illinois Institute of Technology alumni includes graduates and non-graduate former students of Illinois Institute of Technology.

Nobel laureates

Politics and public service

Education

Business

Engineering

Computer science

Natural sciences

Humanities

Architecture and design

Arts and entertainment

Social and behavioral sciences

Notes 

 
Illinois Institute of Technology
Illinois Institute of Technology alumni